Marko Kleinen (born 27 July 2001) is a Dutch professional footballer who plays as a midfielder for Eerste Divisie club MVV.

Career
Kleinen joined the MVV youth academy from his first club RKSV Leonidas-W in 2011. In the 2019–20 season, he featured as an unused substitute for the first team on several occassions. He made his professional debut on 30 August 2020, replacing Tim Zeegers in the 79th minute of a 0–0 away draw in the Eerste Divisie against Almere City.

On 13 February 2021, Kleinen made his first ever start for MVV in a 1–0 away defeat to De Graafschap. Four days later, he signed his first professional deal with MVV; a two-year contract.

Kleinen scored his first goal at senior level on 30 September 2022, starting MVV's eventual 3–2 second-half comeback win over Willem II by curling home a shot into the right-hand corner.

Career statistics

References

External links
 

2001 births
Living people
Dutch footballers
Association football midfielders
MVV Maastricht players
Eerste Divisie players
Footballers from Maastricht